Laura Christine Kinsey is an American mathematician specializing in topology. She is a professor of mathematics at Canisius College.

Education
Kinsey graduated from the University of Maryland, College Park in 1975 with honors in mathematics. She returned to the University of Maryland, College Park for graduate study, completing a Ph.D. there in 1984. Her dissertation, Pseudoisotopies and Submersions of a Compact Manifold to the Circle, was jointly supervised by Henry C. King and Walter Neumann.

Books
Kinsey is the author of mathematics textbooks that include:
Topology of Surfaces (Undergraduate Texts in Mathematics, Springer, 1993)
Symmetry, Shape, and Space: An Introduction to Mathematics through Geometry (with Teresa Moore, Springer, 2002)
Geometry and Symmetry (with Teresa Moore and Efstratios Prassidis, Wiley, 2010)

References

Year of birth missing (living people)
Living people
20th-century American mathematicians
21st-century American mathematicians
American women mathematicians
Topologists
University of Maryland, College Park alumni
Canisius College faculty
20th-century American women
21st-century American women